HITRUST is a privately held company located in Frisco, Texas, United States that, in collaboration with healthcare, technology and information security organizations, established the HITRUST CSF. The company claims CSF is a comprehensive, prescriptive, and certifiable framework, that can be used by all organizations that create, access, store or exchange sensitive and/or regulated data. 

HITRUST originally served as an acronym for "Health Information Trust Alliance", but the company has since rebranded as simply HITRUST. HITRUST includes a for-profit division (HITRUST Services Corp) and a not-for-profit division (HITRUST Alliance).

The HITRUST CSF

The HITRUST CSF (created to stand for "Common Security Framework", since rebranded as simply the HITRUST CSF) is a prescriptive set of controls that meet the requirements of multiple regulations and standards. The framework provides a way to comply with standards such as ISO/IEC 27000-series and HIPAA. Since the HITRUST CSF incorporates various security, privacy, and other regulatory requirements from existing frameworks and standards, some organizations utilize this framework to demonstrate their security and compliance in a consistent and streamlined manner. Organizations can complete a self-assessment using the HITRUST framework, or they can engage with a HITRUST assessor for an external, third-party engagement. 

HITRUST CSF has garnered criticism for being "cumbersome, expensive, arbitrary, unnecessarily complex", and using "outdated data".

Current version of CSF is v11, released in January 2023.

Executive Council
HITRUST is led by a management team and governed by an Executive Council made up of leaders from across a variety of industry. These leaders represent the governance of the organization, but other founders also comprise the leadership to ensure the framework meets the short- and long-term needs of the entire industry.

Executive Council members represent the following organizations:

 Elevance Health, Inc.
 Express Scripts, Inc.
 Health Care Service Corporation
 Highmark
 Humana Inc.
 IMS Health
 Kaiser Permanente
 McKesson Corporation
 UnitedHealth Group

References

 How To Get HITRUST Certified?
 Hitrust Assessment 
 HITRUST Alliance Official website

Health information technology companies